Mingə is a village in the Ismailli Rayon of Azerbaijan.  The village forms part of the municipality of Keyvəndi. The area is renowned for excessive bush and dryness, due to being situated on one of the two highest peaks of Azerbaijan.

References 

Populated places in Ismayilli District